Beverley Elliott (born 31 December 1960) is a Canadian actress and singer-songwriter. She is best known for playing the role of Granny in Once Upon a Time,  Maggie Krell in Harper's Island, Brick Bannerman in Kingdom Hospital and Sally Duffield in Bordertown.

Filmography

Films

Television

References

External links

Canadian film actresses
Canadian television actresses
Actresses from Ontario
Canadian singer-songwriters
Living people
1960 births